Katherine Sarah Copeland MBE (born 1 December 1990) is a retired British Olympic Gold Medal winning rower.

Personal life
She was born in Ashington, to vet parents Derek and Penny (they owned Copeland Veterinary Surgey, in Ingleby Barwick in 2012). She was 14 when she first learnt to row at Yarm School. She is a member of Tees Rowing Club, Stockton-on-Tees.
As a teacher, she also runs an after school art club for autistic children in conjunction with the Three Wings Trust.

She was appointed Member of the Order of the British Empire (MBE) in the 2013 New Year Honours for services to rowing.

In July 2017 she received an Honorary Degree from Teesside University.

Career
An U23 World Champion in the women's lightweight single sculls, in 2012, she was selected to represent Great Britain in the 2012 London Olympics in the Women's lightweight double sculls with Sophie Hosking, winning the gold medal, during the so-called  "Super Saturday".

Katherine, being brought up in Ingleby Barwick and as a part of the 2012 Summer Olympics and Paralympics gold post boxes commemoration, had a red post box in The Rings village of Ingleby Barwick painted gold in her name, with a plaque about the gold medal win.

Following her Olympic partner Hosking's retirement in 2012, Copeland partnered with Imogen Walsh in the lightweight double sculls, winning European bronze  in 2014.  Copeland went on to partner Charlotte Taylor, winning silver at the 2015 World Rowing Championships and gold at the 2015 European Rowing Championships.

Copeland and Taylor finished 14th in Women's lightweight double sculls at the 2016 Rio Olympics.

Copeland won another European bronze medal in the lightweight double sculls in 2017, this time with Emily Craig.

Copeland announced her retirement from competitive rowing in January 2019.

References

1990 births
Living people
English female rowers
Rowers at the 2012 Summer Olympics
Rowers at the 2016 Summer Olympics
English Olympic medallists
Olympic rowers of Great Britain
Sportspeople from Ashington
Olympic gold medallists for Great Britain
Olympic medalists in rowing
Members of the Order of the British Empire
Medalists at the 2012 Summer Olympics
World Rowing Championships medalists for Great Britain
European Rowing Championships medalists